Pardon My Take (abbreviated "PMT") is a comedic sports podcast released three times per week by Barstool Sports. It is hosted by Dan "Big Cat" Katz and PFT Commenter. The podcast debuted on February 29, 2016. It first appeared on the US iTunes charts on March 2, 2016, in the number one position.

Over the years, Pardon My Take featured many different interns. They include Jake Marsh, Billy Football (the intern) and less notably Jilly Football. Today, Jake Marsh and Billy Football regularly contribute on the show. Along with them, Cameraman BatGirl and a character by the name of Memes also occasionally chime in on the show.

The podcast's audience generally ranges between 750 thousand and 1.5 million listeners per episode. In 2016, Apple named Pardon My Take one of the best podcasts of 2016, and in 2017, The Big Lead ranked Katz and PFT Commenter as the number one sports media talents under 40. In 2018, Pardon My Take was the 14th most downloaded podcast of the year on iTunes.

Pardon My Take listeners are usually referred to as "AWLs" or award winning listeners.

History
Pardon My Take was first launched in February 2016 when PFT Commenter left the sports website SB Nation to join Barstool Sports. Longtime Barstool contributor Big Cat had been regularly communicating with PFT Commenter through Twitter prior to 2016 and the two teamed up to create Pardon My Take.

Since its inception, Pardon My Take has used satire to comment on traditional sports media, particularly ESPN and some of its notable personalities. The show's name is a play on the titles of ESPN television shows Pardon the Interruption and First Take. The logo of the podcast, which took graphic elements from the two ESPN shows, prompted ESPN to send a cease-and-desist letter to Barstool Sports soon after the launch of the podcast. Barstool did change the logo.

Beginning in early March 2020, Pardon My Take began to be affected by the COVID-19 virus, as it is a podcast that revolves around current events in the sporting world. In order to keep the show interesting and running 3 days a week (Monday, Wednesday, and Friday), PFT Commenter and Big Cat implemented a new segment, usually at the end of the podcast, to review popular TV shows such as "Love is Blind" and the popular Netflix documentary known as "Tiger King", they went on to also review the documentary "The King of Kong: Fistful of Quarters" and "The Garbage Picking Field Goal Kicker". The two co-hosts still provide interviews with popular sports figures and other celebrities in each episode. They also implemented a Dungeons and Dragons segment on May 23, 2020, with Timm Woods as the Dungeon Master. The sports hiatus also signaled the beginning of the "Mount Flushmore" series, a play on their "Mount Rushmores"' of the past, some of the topics they used have been fears, places to be drunk, toppings, appetizers, and states of the United States of America.

Format
Most Pardon My Take episodes consist of three parts. The hosts open the show with a recap of current sports news. News is followed by an interview with a sports personality, celebrity, journalist, or athlete. The show is closed with a collection of recurring original segments which vary episode to episode. Popular segments include: "Hot Seat, Cool Throne", "Who's Back of the Week", "Fyre Fest of the Week", and "Guys on Chicks". Occasionally, the Pardon My Take hosts will alter the show's format for special episodes, including their yearly recap show and their annual award show since 2016, the "Takies." The hosts have held video exit interviews with their guests. Most of the interviews throughout 2016 concluded by Big Cat asking the guest three questions—if the guest washed their apples, who the most famous person in the guest's cell phone was, and a third question tailored to each guest. This third question was often the most provocative one of the interview and began with Big Cat saying "a question I'm gonna ask, that you don't have to answer, but I'm gonna ask anyway."

The show opens by playing "Electric Avenue" by Eddie Grant, and closes by playing (an often re-mixed version of) "Take On Me" by A-ha. For example, the April 14, 2021, episode ended with the vocals of "Take On Me" dubbed over the song from the Buick commercials.

Lottery Ball Machine 
On August 28, 2020 Big Cat received a Ping-Pong Ball Lottery Machine for the Pardon My Take studio. The addition of the Lottery Ball Machine added a new segment where before ending the show hosts Big Cat and PFT Commenter along with supporting staff Billy Football, Jake Marsh, PMTMemes, Liam "Bubba" Crowley, Hank, and producer Max would guess a number 1-100. Billy Football was the first member of the show to guess a ball correctly, guessing 69 on December 4, 2020. Over the course of the next two years, all members of the Podcast correctly guessed the number except for Hank.

Blake of the Year

History
Blake of the Year (BOTY) is an annual competition put on by the PMT crew during the summer Takie Awards. Since 2018, participants have been selected based on whether they display qualities that Big Cat and PFT Commenter believe are typical of people named Blake. Examples of such are: a lax outlook on their profession; seeming to be an average dude; or just having the name Blake (some exceptions apply. See Brooks Koepka).

In the inaugural competition in 2018, Blake Bortles recorded a response time of 11.70 seconds while Blake Griffin missed the call after falling asleep on a plane in route to Las Vegas to participate in Team USA’s training camp. 

In 2019, the competition expanded to include Brooks "Blake" Koepka who reported a debut response time of 7.90 seconds. Blake Bortles was unable to be reached this year while Blake Griffin rebounded astoundingly by posting a record setting response time of 2.80 seconds, a record that still stands to this day. 

In 2020, Blake Bortles posted a response time of 5.75 seconds but was narrowly beaten out by Brooks Koepka who recorded a response time of 5.50 seconds. Despite his competitors' incredibly quick response times, Blake Griffin continued his reign of dominance with a response time of 3.30 seconds, cementing himself as the first back-to-back or "Blake-to-Blake" champion in Blake of the Year history.

In 2021, after an excruciatingly long competition, Blake Bortles became the second two-time winner in Blake of the Year history by having his lottery ball number called after nearly 30 minutes of play. 

In 2022, the participants field shrank back down to two Blakes after Brooks Koepka was suspended from play following his signing with the LIV tour. After three rounds of trivia, Blake Bortles failed to list all of the teams Blake Griffin had played for in his career whereas Blake Griffin correctly recalled all of the teams Blake Bortles played for, winning the trivia by a score of 5.5 to 5. With his trivia victory, Blake Griffin was then given the opportunity to call the coin flip to determine the winner which he subsequently called correctly with a choice of tails. Blake Griffin continued his dominant run to become the first three-time champion in Blake of the Year history with many calling it a historic dynasty.

Rules 
Originally, the rules for the competition were very simple. During a recording of the show, one of the hosts would call a Blake; whoever picked up first was ruled the winner. The timer would start at the moment of the host dialing and end once the Blake answered the call and spoke into the phone.

In 2021, the rules were changed to a random number draw from a Chinese lottery machine. Each round the Blakes would pick a number 1-100, and if their number was selected they would be ruled the winner.

In 2022, the rules were changed to a trivia gameshow where contestants answered a series of trivia questions with the Blake answering the most questions correctly having the opportunity to call a coin flip between the contestants to determine the winner.

Competitors 
Regular participants are Blake Griffin, Blake Bortles and Brooks Koepka.

In June 2022, after it was announced that he would join the LIV tour, Brooks Koepka was suspended from the competition upon appeal.

Winners 
The winner of the competition receives the honor of being the voice of the shows introduction, "It's Pardon My Take presented by Barstool Sports" for every episode of that upcoming year.

References

External links
 

Comedy and humor podcasts
Sports podcasts
2016 podcast debuts
Audio podcasts
American podcasts